is the 35th single by Japanese entertainer Akina Nakamori. Written by Yasuhiro Suzu and Atsuko, the single was released on February 11, 1998, by Gauss Entertainment under the This One label. It was also the lead single from her 18th studio album Spoon.

Background 
"Kisei (Never Forget)" was Nakamori's first release under Gauss Entertainment, less than a year after departing from MCA Victor. It was used as the theme song of the YTV drama series , which also starred Nakamori.

Nakamori re-recorded "Kisei (Never Forget)" on her 2007 compilation album Ballad Best: 25th Anniversary Selection.

Chart performance 
"Kisei (Never Forget)" peaked at No. 19 on Oricon's weekly singles chart and sold over 94,900 copies.

Track listing

Charts

References

External links 
 
 

1998 singles
1998 songs
Akina Nakamori songs
Japanese-language songs
Japanese television drama theme songs